Joel Lawrence Malter (May 9, 1931 – June 5, 2006), an internationally known dealer in ancient coins and antiquities, became a recognized expert, scholar and pioneer in these fields.

Career 
Upon graduating from the University of California at Los Angeles in 1953, Malter enlisted in the United States Air Force, with an initial station in England and later one in Tripoli, Libya. He quickly earned the rank of Captain, and his new bride Adele joined him in England. (During his duty in England in 1954 his first child Lisa was born.) After serving abroad, Joel and his new family returned to Los Angeles, where he began his teaching career as an instructor in history and English at Webster Junior High in Los Angeles, California.  During this time he received from his Uncle George in New York City a gift which changed his life: an ancient Greek silver coin that George had found in the North African desert while on active duty during World War II. Captain Malter's service abroad greatly heightened his quest for learning more about this very old coin. He searched in local libraries for more knowledge about this and other ancient coins. The coin that he received as a gift came from the Ptolemaic Dynasty in Ancient Egypt—a silver tetradrachm of Ptolemy I, Soter, pharaoh between 305 and 283 B.C.  

Malter sought more ancient coins to collect, research and use in school to help educate his students. His strong passion for learning as much as he could about ancient coins and then teaching what he had learned to his students made his ancient-history class one of the most sought-after courses in the entire school. In a matter of a few years, ancient coins had consumed his teaching duties and had steered him towards a new career.  He quit his teaching job in 1961 and became a full-time classical numismatist. At the time of this move only a handful of individuals in the entire United States dealt full-time in ancient coins.  more than one hundred - and perhaps double or even triple that amount - ancient-coin firms dealt mostly via the internet, a method of selling ancient coins first started by Malter's firm in the early 1990s. Malter's auction catalogues, articles published in COINage magazine in the 1970s and 1980s, and various other scholarly works on ancient coins, antiquities and collecting have become much sought-after and respected by collectors and worldwide dealers alike.

Malter began his small one-man business in the garage of his home in Venice, California, and soon started to realize profits unachievable at that time in teaching. His move paid off. The 1960s and 1970s saw his small business turn into one of the most successful ancient-coin dealerships in the world. In 1978, upon his graduation from California State University Northridge, Joel Malter's son Michael Malter joined what became the family business. The firm bought and sold and auctioned ancient coins and related antiquities worldwide from a prominent address on Ventura Boulevard, Los Angeles. Malter's daughter Debbie Poe joined Joel L. Malter Inc. in the late 1980s. 

During his lifetime Malter's collecting interests changed and diversified to include fine coins and collectibles from all over the world. He also assembled one of the finest numismatic and art libraries, which rivaled many university collections. On June 4 and 5 2006 a public and Internet auction at his California home sold Malter's prized numismatic library. Malter passed away hours before the second session of his auction, scheduled for later that morning.

References 

1931 births
2006 deaths
Place of birth missing